Drimnagh is a stop on the Luas light-rail tram system in Dublin, Ireland.  It opened in 2004 as a stop on the Red Line.  The stop is located on a section of track which runs alongside the Grand Canal, in Drimnagh.  It provides access to Our Lady's Children's Hospital, Crumlin and the Richmond Barracks.

The stop was built at the same time as a footbridge which allows access to areas on the north of the canal.  However, unlike the nearby Goldenbridge, the bridge is not step-free accessible.

The stop is also served by Dublin Bus route 123.

Drimnagh is intended to be a stop on the proposed Luas line to Lucan.

Gallery

References

Luas Red Line stops in Dublin (city)